Ho Fung College is an English-instructed co-education secondary school in Hong Kong. The school is sponsored by Sik Sik Yuen. Established in 1974, the school has gained popularity with its all-around student performance across academic disciplines and sports sphere. The current principal is Mr. Siu, Chi-Sun, starting his term in 2012.

Education philosophy
To uphold the sponsoring body's spirit of "Pujiquanshan" and provide students with quality education; apart from academic achievements, the school places heavy emphasis on students' comprehensive and balanced development.

School facilities
The school is situated at Lei Muk Shue, with the following campus facilities:

Academic curriculum

Junior forms 
 Coordinated in Chinese: Chinese Language, Chinese History, Putonghua, Moral Education (F3)
 Coordinated in English: English Language, Mathematics, Integrated Science (F1, F2), Chemistry (F3), Physics (F3), Biology (F3), Geography, History, Life and Society, Visual Arts, Computer Science, Music, Technology and Living, Physical Education

Senior forms 
 Coordinated in Chinese: Chinese Language, Liberal Studies, Chinese History, Chinese Literature, Moral Education
 Coordinated in English: English Language, Liberal Studies, Mathematics (Compulsory), Mathematics (Extended Module 1 & 2), Chemistry, Physics, Biology, Geography, History, Economics, Business, Accounting and Financial Studies, Information and Communication Technology, Physical Education
 Electives offered outside regular curriculum: Music, Visual Arts, Physical Education (HKDSE)

Extra-curricular 
More than 40 societies and teams of academics, sports, aesthetics, and community services are organised by students, with the following societies and teams:

Student achievements

Academic competitions 
English Debate
 The 16th NESTA Debating competition - Champion
 Hong Kong Secondary School Debating Competition 2015 - Champion
Chinese Debate
 The 9th Basic Law Debating Competition Basic Law Cup - 2nd runner-up
 The 13th Basic Law Debating Competition Basic Law Cup - Champion

Non-academic competitions 
Odyssey of the Mind
 Odyssey of the Mind 2000 World Finals - Champion
 Odyssey of the Mind 2016 World Finals - 1st Runner-up

Sports tournaments 
Bank of China (Hong Kong) 56th Festival of Sport - Hong Kong Secondary School Baseball Elite Championship 2013
 Women's Junior: Champion
Samsung 59th Festival of Sport - Hong Kong Secondary School Baseball Elite Championship 2016
 Women's Junior: Champion 
 Women's Senior: Champion

Tsuen Wan & Island Secondary Schools Area 
2006-2007 Results
 Boys Overall: Champion
 Girls Overall: Champion

2007-2008 Results
 Boys Overall: 1st runner-up
 Girls Overall: Champion

2008-2009 Results
 Boys Overall: Champion
 Girls Overall: Champion

2009-2010 Results
 Boys Overall: 1st runner-up
 Girls Overall: Champion

2010-2011 Results
 Boys Overall: 3rd runner-up
 Girls Overall: 1st runner-up

2011-2012 Results
 Boys Overall: 2nd runner-up
 Girls Overall: Champion

2012-2013 Results
 Boys Overall: 4th runner-up
 Girls Overall: 1st runner-up

2013-2014 Results
 Boys Overall: 2nd runner-up
 Girls Overall: 1st runner-up

Students' Association
The Students' Association was established in 1989. Cabinets over the years are listed as follows:
 1997-1998 Hiu Fung Cabinet (曉雋閣)
 1998-1999 Wai Fung Cabinet (蔚風閣)
 2001-2002 Wai Fung Cabinet (蔚風閣)
 2002-2003 Chi Dung Chi Cabinet (自動治閣)
 2003-2004 Luen Hup Cabinet (聯合閣)
 2004-2005 Nei Seung Cabinet (你想閣)
 2005-2006 Lei Ka Cabinet (利家閣)
 2006-2007 Ho Mong Cabinet (好望閣)
 2007-2008 Chek Lap Cabinet (赤臘閣)
 2008-2009 Triangle 叄角
 2009-2010 361° Cabinet
 2010-2011 Leun Hup Cabinet (聯合閣 Unimate)
 2011-2012 Fung Kwong (風狂 HoFungHolic)
 2012-2013 Nova
 2013-2014 Canvas
 2014-2015 Apex
 2015-2016 Colibri
 2016-2017 IOTA
 2017-2018 Apricity
 2018-2019 Apeiron
 2019-2020 Misneach
 2020-2021 Meraki
 2021-2022 Novelty
 2022-2023 Epoch

Alumni Association 
The Alumni Association was established in 1984. The Association aims at bonding alumni and connecting them with the alma mater. Scholarships are offered to current students with academic achievement. The current Chairlady is Ms. Camilla Lee.

Notable alumni

Medical profession 
 Ms. Chan, Yin-ping - Head of Health & Care Service Department at Hong Kong Red Cross

Education 
 Professor Yao, Chi-On - Assistant Professor at Chinese University of Hong Kong
 Mr. Siu, Yuen - Chinese Tutor at Modern Education
 Mr. Lam, Yat-Yan (YY Lam) - Chinese Tutor at Beacon College

Media 
 Ashley Hau - Reporter at NowTV
 Edcon Gabriel Yau - Sports Presenter & Commentator at NowSports

Other SSY institutes

Education centre 
 Ho Koon Nature Education cum Astronomical Centre

Secondary school 
 Ho Lap College
 Ho Dao College
 Ho Ngai College
 Ho Yu College and Primary School

Primary school 
 Ho Shun Primary School
 Ho Lap Primary School
 Ho Ming Primary School

Kindergarten and nursery 
 Ho Yu Kindergarten
 Ho Shui Kindergarten
 Ho Lap Kindergarten
 Ho Ching Kindergarten
 Ho Yan Kindergarten
 Ho Tak Kindergarten and Ho Tak Child Care Centre
 Ho Oi Day Nursery

References

Secondary schools in Hong Kong
Sik Sik Yuen
Confucian schools in Hong Kong
Buddhist schools in Hong Kong